Long Pond is a lake in Barnstable County, Massachusetts. It is located in South Yarmouth.

References 

Lakes of Massachusetts
Lakes of Barnstable County, Massachusetts